Hassan Afif (born 20 December 1956), is a Tanzanian–born, Somali raised and of Yemeni origin football manager and former footballer. He comes from the famous and well-known Yafa tribe and is the father of footballers Akram and Ali.

Football career
He previously played for Simba in Tanzania and Horseed in Somalia and Somalia national team, before moving to Qatar and playing for Al Ittihad. He was later naturalized as a Qatari citizen. After he retired from playing, he managed Al Gharafa from 1986 till 1987 and Al Markhiya from 2001 till 2003 and 2006 till 2007.

Personal life
Afif has six offspring and was born in Moshi, Tanzania. He is Somali of Arab Yemeni decent.  His son, Akram Afif plays for QSL side Al Sadd SC. His wife, Fayza, comes from Yemen.

References

External links

1956 births
Living people
People with acquired Somali citizenship
Somalian footballers
Simba S.C. players
Al-Gharafa SC players
Naturalised citizens of Qatar
Qatar Stars League players
Somalia international footballers
Somalian expatriate footballers
Qatari people of Somali descent
Association football midfielders
Tanzanian Premier League players